Travoprost/timolol, sold under the brand name Duotrav among others, is a fixed-dose combination medication used for the treatment of glaucoma. It contains travoprost and timolol maleate.

It was approved for medical use in the European Union in April 2006.

References

External links 
 

Combination drugs
Ophthalmology drugs